Horton Kirby and South Darenth  is a civil parish in the Sevenoaks District of Kent, England.  The parish  is located in the River Darent valley between Sevenoaks town and Dartford: it consists of the two villages of Horton Kirby and South Darenth.  It was originally known simply as Horton Kirby parish.

Horton Kirby Paper Mills in South Darenth were founded by Henry Hall at the beginning of the 19th century. Since June 2003, the mills have ceased processing paper.

References

External links
Parish Council website: includes history of the parish

Civil parishes in Kent
Sevenoaks District